Ioannis Constantinou (born 23 March 1978) is a retired Cypriot high jumper.

He finished eleventh at the 2001 Mediterranean Games, won a bronze medal at the 2003 Summer Universiade, a silver medal at the 2005 Mediterranean Games and finished tenth at the 2006 Commonwealth Games. He also competed at the 2002 Commonwealth Games without reaching the final.

His personal best is 2.24 metres, achieved in May 2004 in Sparta.

References

1978 births
Living people
Cypriot male high jumpers
Universiade medalists in athletics (track and field)
Mediterranean Games silver medalists for Cyprus
Mediterranean Games medalists in athletics
Athletes (track and field) at the 2005 Mediterranean Games
Universiade bronze medalists for Cyprus
Medalists at the 2003 Summer Universiade
Athletes (track and field) at the 2002 Commonwealth Games
Athletes (track and field) at the 2006 Commonwealth Games
Commonwealth Games competitors for Cyprus